Qian Jiegei (born 4 January 1992), born in Gabon as Alexander N'Doumbou, is a professional footballer who plays for Chinese Super League club Zhejiang. He formerly represented the Gabon national football team.

Club career 
N'Doumbou began his football career at Division 1 Gabonese club AS Sogara's youth team. At the age of 12, N'Doumbou departed the country for France to join local club FC Carpentras in the south of France. He later had a stint at Martigues before joining Marseille on a trial. After having a successful trial, N'Doumbou was offered an aspirant (youth) contract. While in the club's youth academy, he was captain of the Marseille under-17 team that won the 2008–09 Championnat National Under-17 league title. On 18 November 2009, N'Doumbou signed his first professional contract. The contract took effect on 1 July 2011 as the player had to play out the two years left on his élite contract. N'Doumbou made his professional debut on 9 January 2010, five days after his 18th birthday, in a Coupe de France match against amateur club Trélissac in a 2–0 victory.

On 10 August 2011, N'Doumbou joined Orléans on a one-year loan. After spending a season for the third tier club, N'Doumbou returned to Marseille where he was incorporated in the Marseille B team who were allowed to play in the fifth tier of French football. On 30 June 2013 N'Doumbou was loaned out once again to Orléans. He returned to the Marseille B and despite being included on the bench for Marseille in August 2016, N'Doumbou signed with Belgian third vision side, FCV Dender EH.

In July 2018, N'doumbou moved to Bulgarian first division club, FC Vereya. N'Doumbou resumed his Chinese nationality and joined Chinese Super League side Shanghai Greenland Shenhua in February 2019. N'Doumbou lifted the CFA Cup with Shanghai Greenland Shenhua on 6 December 2019. After four seasons in Shanghai he would move to another Chinese Super League club in Zhejiang on 17 January 2023.

International career 
N'Doumbou plays for the Gabon national team having earned his first call up to the team by former coach Alain Giresse in November 2009. In February 2019, N'Doumbou renounced his Gabonese passport to apply for restoration of Chinese nationality, but with N'Doumbou himself making appearances for Gabon in major tournaments, he will be no longer eligible to play for either Gabon national team or China national team.

Personal life 
N'Doumbou was born in Port-Gentil to a Gabonese father and a Chinese Hakka mother who had previously met in China where his father, Mr. Dieudonné Ndoumbou had been attending school.

Career statistics

Club 

(Correct as of 31 January 2023)

International 

(Correct as of 14 June 2012)

Honours
Shanghai Shenhua
Chinese FA Cup: 2019

See also
List of Chinese naturalized footballers

References

External links
  
 Alexander N'Doumbou profile at om.net
 
 
 

1992 births
Living people
Gabonese footballers
Gabon international footballers
Chinese footballers
Gabonese people of Chinese descent
Chinese people of Gabonese descent
Sportspeople of Gabonese descent
Olympic footballers of Gabon
Olympique de Marseille players
FC Vereya players
Shanghai Shenhua F.C. players
Chinese Super League players
First Professional Football League (Bulgaria) players
2011 CAF U-23 Championship players
Footballers at the 2012 Summer Olympics
2015 Africa Cup of Nations players
Gabonese expatriate footballers
Expatriate footballers in France
Gabonese expatriate sportspeople in France
Expatriate footballers in Bulgaria
Sportspeople of Chinese descent
Association football midfielders
People from Ogooué-Maritime Province
Naturalized citizens of the People's Republic of China